Iran Barkley (born May 6, 1960) is an American former professional boxer who competed from 1982 to 1999. He held world championships in three weight classes, including the WBC middleweight title from 1988 to 1989, the IBF super middleweight title from 1992 to 1993, and the WBA light heavyweight title in 1992. As an amateur boxer, Barkley won a bronze medal in the middleweight division at the 1982 World Championships.

Early life and family
Iran Barkley was the youngest of eight children raised in the Patterson Houses. His parents were Frank Barkley, Sr. and Georgia Barkley. He was a member of the Black Spades street gang in his youth, along with former heavyweight contender Mitch Green. Iran's sister Yvonne, who boxed professionally during the late 1970s, convinced him to start boxing when he was 13 years old, training under Bobby Miles and Connie Bryant.

He is the great uncle of NFL running back Saquon Barkley.

Amateur achievements
1981 – Silver Medal (165 lb) at the New York Golden Gloves, losing to Dennis Milton
1981 – Gold Medal (165 lb) at the Empire State Games
1982 – Bronze Medal (165 lb)at the Copenhagen Box Cup in Copenhagen, Denmark
1982 – Bronze Medal (75 kg) at the World Championships in Munich, West Germany

Professional career

Known as "The Blade", Barkley turned professional in December 1982, and first challenged for a world title against the highly skilled Italian Sumbu Kalambay, losing on points over fifteen rounds for the vacant WBA middleweight title in Livorno, Toscana, Italy in October 1987.

Barkley returned in 1988 with a split decision over Sanderline Williams and a fifth-round stoppage of Michael Olajide, before winning the WBC middleweight title with a third-round knockout of Thomas Hearns, voted 1988 Upset of the Year by The Ring magazine.

In his next fight, Barkley lost his title via split decision in a 12-round war with Roberto Durán, in a fight proclaimed 1989 Fight of the Year by Ring magazine. Following the defeat to Duran, Barkley took on undefeated Michael Nunn for the IBF and lineal middleweight titles, dropping a close majority decision. He next fought Nigel Benn in a challenge for the WBO middleweight title and was stopped on the three-knockdown rule at the end of a wild first round in which both fighters were hurt.

After losing to Benn, Barkley underwent surgery for a detached retina and was inactive for a year. Barkley returned with two low-key wins at light heavyweight in 1991, then defeated Darrin Van Horn to win the IBF super middleweight title in two rounds in January 1992 in Paramount Theatre, New York. Just two months later, he went on to again defeat Hearns and take his WBA light heavyweight title via a twelve-round split decision. Barkley vacated the title without defending it, choosing instead to defend his super middleweight title against IBF and lineal middleweight champion James Toney. Barkley reportedly had trouble getting back down to the 168 lb weight limit and lost his IBF title via a corner retirement after nine rounds due to severe swelling around both eyes.

Barkley's final shot at a title would come against undefeated Henry Maske at light heavyweight for Maske's IBF title in Nordrhein-Westfalen, Germany in October 1994. Barkley again lost by corner retirement after nine rounds.

Barkley continued to fight after this loss, eventually moving up to the heavyweight division. His last fight of note was a June 1997 win for the WBB heavyweight title, a bout in which Barkley retired former WBA heavyweight champion Gerrie Coetzee with a 10th-round TKO.

Barkley 'retired' in 1999 after losing a bout in Mississippi by sixth-round stoppage to Keith McKnight.

Comeback
In 2006, at the age of 46, Barkley won an unsanctioned bout by second-round stoppage in Aruba. In 2008, at age 48, Barkley fought to a six-round draw in an unsanctioned exhibition bout against heavyweight Chauncy Welliver in Lapwai, Idaho at the Pi-Nee-Waus Community Center of the Nez Perce Tribe.

A May 20, 2011, online article on Boxrec News hinted Barkley was seriously considering making a comeback in the ring at age 51.

Honors and awards
Barkley is a member of the New Jersey Boxing Hall of Fame.

Personal life
Barkley's first child was born to Barkley's common law wife Pam in 1981. He has four children and has been divorced twice.

Barkley has fallen on some difficult times since his retirement from boxing. Penniless and unemployed, he became homeless in November 2010 after he was evicted from his Bronx apartment. Through the support of the Bronx nonprofit BronxWorks and the Ring 10 boxing charity, he found housing and receives assistance so he can become self-supporting.

Barkley resides in the Morrisania area of the South Bronx.

Barkley enjoys teaching boxing skills to young amateurs.

He is a ringside regular at boxing matches in New York City.

Barkley's great-nephew, Saquon Barkley, is an NFL running back who was selected with the second pick in the 2018 NFL Draft.

Professional boxing record

References

External links

1960 births
Living people
African-American boxers
Boxers from New York City
Sportspeople from the Bronx
Gang members
American male boxers
AIBA World Boxing Championships medalists
Heavyweight boxers
World Boxing Association champions
World Boxing Council champions
International Boxing Federation champions
World middleweight boxing champions
World super-middleweight boxing champions
World light-heavyweight boxing champions
21st-century African-American people
20th-century African-American sportspeople